Edcouch-Elsa High School (EEHS) is a public high school in Elsa, Texas. It is part of the Edcouch-Elsa Independent School District and is known as La Maquina Amarilla; their mascot is a Yellow jacket. It is located at Hwy 107 Mile 4 North Yellow Jacket Drive.

History

In the fall of 1968, Mexican American students demanded several things to be fixed by the schools, for example the eradication of the no Spanish-speaking rule. As the district did nothing for the students, 162 Chicano students walked out in protest. The school decided to expel 62 of the students. The newly-established Mexican American Legal Defense and Education Fund (MALDEF) filed a lawsuit against the schools. MALDEF claimed that the schools had violated the students' right to peaceful protest. In December, the courts agreed with MALDEF and demanded the school reinstate those students. This was the first major win for MALDEF in Texas.

Student Demographics
As of the 2007-2008 school year there was approximately 1,584 students at Edcouch-Elsa High School and they compete in 32-4A.  6% of the students are considered economically disadvantaged.

Football

Edcouch-Elsa is two small and independent towns that share one high-school. Despite any differences that may exist, there is one thing that unites them both—Football!

Since joining the 4A ranks in 1980, Edcouch-Elsa has experienced considerable success in the sport of football. Today, Edcouch-Elsa is arguably one of the Rio Grande Valley's premier best football programs because of their numerous district titles and playoff appearances.   For example, the Yellow Jackets have successfully defended their 32-4a district title for the last six consecutive years (2003–2008), which brings them to a total of 46 district titles.    The Yellow Jackets have also had a series of playoff runs through the decades, the furthest being a pair of quarterfinal appearances in 1989 and 1997.

The true heart and soul of E-E football lies in the fan-base and community support.

The Edcouch-Elsa 7-on-7 team traveled to Louisiana to and took home the championship of the LSU 7-on-7 Tournament in July 2008

The Edcouch-Elsa 7-on-7 football team made its way to Texas A & M in 2012.

In 2012 Edcouch-Elsa was put under probation after their high school football team practiced 16 hours in week 0. The UIL rules say the teams have to practice 8 hours a week. The 2012 season district games were counted. Edcouch-Elsa made it to the 3rd round of playoffs

La Maquina Amarilla
La Maquina Amarilla (The Big Yellow Machine) is how they are known all across the Rio Grande Valley.  They start and end every game with the classic Viva! La Maquina phrase.

Fight Song
The Edcouch-Elsa High School Fight song 
is called " Mr. EE"

See also
Edcouch-Elsa Independent School District

References

External links
Edcouch-Elsa High School
Edcouch-Elsa Independent School District
E-E Unofficial Sports webpage

High schools in Hidalgo County, Texas
Public high schools in Texas